Kaveh-ye Vosta (also Romanized as Kāveh-ye Vosţá; and Deh-e Vosţá) is a village in Kakavand-e Sharqi Rural District, Kakavand District, Delfan County, Lorestan Province, Iran. At the 2006 census, its population was 40, in 9 families.

References 

Towns and villages in Delfan County